Gary Robert E Martin (born 27 February 1968) is a former English cricketer.  Martin was a right-handed batsman.  He was born at Chessington, Surrey.

Martin represented the Surrey Cricket Board in 2 List A matches against the Gloucestershire Cricket Board and the Essex Cricket Board in the 1st and 2nd rounds of the 2003 Cheltenham & Gloucester Trophy which was played in 2002.  In his 2 List A matches, he scored 20 runs at a batting average of 10.00, with a high score of 13.

References

External links
Gary Martin at Cricinfo
Gary Martin at CricketArchive

1968 births
Living people
People from Surrey
English cricketers
Surrey Cricket Board cricketers